Moje najmilšie is the first compilation album by Marika Gombitová, released on OPUS in 1985.

Track listing

Official releases
 1985: Moje najmilšie, LP, MC, OPUS, #9113 1599
 1996: Moje najmilšie, re-release, CD, OPUS #91 2491

Credits and personnel

 Marika Gombitová - lead vocal, writer
 Ján Lehotský - writer
 Ján Lauko - writer, producer
 Kamil Peteraj - lyrics

 Milan Vašica - producer
 Štefan Danko - responsible editor
 Juraj Filo - sound director
 Zuzana Mináčová - photography

References

General

Specific

External links 
 

1985 compilation albums
Marika Gombitová compilation albums